Bella Vista is a resort (balneario) in the Maldonado Department of southeastern Uruguay.

Geography
It borders the resort Solís to the west and the resort Las Flores to the east.

Population
In 2011 Bella Vista had a population of 141 permanent inhabitants and 549 dwellings.
 
Source: Instituto Nacional de Estadística de Uruguay

References

External links
INE map of Solís and Bella Vista

Populated places in the Maldonado Department